Labrador, officially the Municipality of Labrador, is a 4th class municipality in the province of Pangasinan, Philippines. According to the 2020 census, it has a population of 26,811 people.

Geography

Barangays
Labrador is politically subdivided into 10 barangays. These barangays are headed by elected officials: Barangay Captain, Barangay Council, whose members are called Barangay Councilors. All are elected every three years.

 Bolo (*Kadampat, *Quiray)
 Bongalon
 Dulig
 Laois
 Magsaysay
 Poblacion
 San Gonzalo
 San Jose
 Tobuan
 Uyong

Climate

Demographics

Economy

Government
Labrador, belonging to the second congressional district of the province of Pangasinan, is governed by a mayor designated as its local chief executive and by a municipal council as its legislative body in accordance with the Local Government Code. The mayor, vice mayor, and the councilors are elected directly by the people through an election which is being held every three years.

Elected official

Gallery

References

External links

 Labrador Profile at PhilAtlas.com
 Municipal Profile at the National Competitiveness Council of the Philippines
 Labrador at the Pangasinan Government Website
 Local Governance Performance Management System
 [ Philippine Standard Geographic Code]
 Philippine Census Information

Municipalities of Pangasinan